Hieronymus van Busleyden (Dutch: Jeroen van Busleyden; French: Jérôme de Busleyden) (c.1470 – 27 August 1517) was a patron of learning and a humanist from the Habsburg Netherlands. His name is usually partially Latinized in English, and can also appear as Hieronymus Busleyden or fully Latinized as Hieronymus Buslidius.

Life
Busleyden was born in Arlon as a son of Jeanne Elisabeth de Mussey, of Marville, and Gilles, of an old Luxembourgish family from Bauschleyden, who lived in Arlon (about 30 km south of Bauschleyden) and could afford a more than decent education for their sons. One of Hieronymus's older brothers, François  (1455–1502), filled several political and ecclesiastical functions, including Archbishop of (the Imperial City of) Besançon, under Philip the Handsome, in the transition period from Burgundian to Habsburg Netherlands.

From around 1485, Hieronymus studied in Leuven (under the early humanist Leo Outers), then in Orléans, and finally in Padua where he met Cuthbert Tunstall, who would later write to Henry VIII about his friend. In 1503 or 1504, Busleyden became a councillor and master of requests at the Great Council of the Netherlands at Mechelen. In his diplomatic function, he visited Pope Julius II in Rome and in 1508 welcomed the Holy Roman Emperor, Maxilimilian of Austria, at Mechelen.

Busleyden was a friend of Ferry Carondelet and friend and correspondent of Thomas More and Erasmus. While More and Tunstall were in the Low Countries in 1515 and again – meeting Erasmus – in 1516, they are all likely to have stayed at their friend's residence. More started to write his Utopia there and would later describe Busleyden's house (in Ad Buslidianum de aedibus magnificis Mechliniae) and his collection of ancient coins (in Nummis antiquis apud Hieronymum Buslidianum servatis).

Hieronymus van Busleyden held positions in the Catholic Church: archdeacon of Our Lady's in Cambrai (1503), provost of St. Peter's in Aire-sur-la-Lys and canon of St. Rumbold's in Mechelen, St. Lambert's in Liège, St. Waltrude's in Mons, and St. Gudula in Brussels. In 1515 Margaret's nephew Charles, making his formal entrance as Archduke into the city where he lived, was greeted by Busleyden representing the clergy, in the welcoming speech putting emphasis on the desirability (for the Netherlands) of a peaceful course of action (by the still youthful Charles). Appointed Chancellor by Charles, while travelling to Spain in preparation of Charles' ascendence to the throne, he fell ill and died in Bordeaux. His body was brought to Mechelen and buried in St. Rumbold's Cathedral.

By execution of his last will, written two days before his last voyage, the wealthy Busleyden was the founder of the Collegium Buslidianum, better known as the Collegium Trilingue and at the time not yet formally a part of the University of Leuven.

Footnotes

Sources

1470s births
1517 deaths
People from Arlon
Dutch Renaissance humanists
Canons (priests)